Revolutionary Left may refer to:
 Revolutionary Left (France)
 Revolutionary Left (Spain)
 Revolutionary Left Movement (Peru)
 Revolutionary Left Movement (Chile)
 Revolutionary Left Movement (Bolivia)
 Revolutionary Left Movement (Venezuela)
 Revolutionary Left Union, an electoral front in Peru
 International Socialism (Uruguay) or Revolutionary Left
 Dev Sol

See also
 Far-left politics